Stewart McCullough Clark (April 12, 1890 – 1974) was an American football and basketball coach. He served as the head football coach at Carthage College in Carthage, Illinois from 1915 to 1919 and at Western State College of Colorado—now known as Western Colorado University—from 1928 to 1929, compiling a career college football coaching record of 10–19.  Clark was also the head basketball coach at the University of Wyoming from 1924 to 1928, tallying a mark of 43–24.  He was a brother of Potsy Clark.

Coaching career
Clark was the head football coach at Carthage College in his hometown of Carthage, Illinois (since relocated to Kenosha, Wisconsin), serving for five seasons, from 1915 to 1919, and compiling a record of 8–7.

References

1890 births
1974 deaths
Basketball coaches from Illinois
Carthage Firebirds football coaches
Western Colorado Mountaineers football coaches
Wyoming Cowboys basketball coaches
People from Carthage, Illinois